Cristian Osvaldo Álvarez Reyes (born 9 January 1978) is an Argentine professional footballer who plays mainly as a right back.

He played six years of his career in Spain, amassing league totals of 170 matches and 33 goals in representation of three teams (42/6 in La Liga).

Football career
Born in Buenos Aires, Álvarez began his career at Club Atlético Lanús in the Argentine Primera División in 1998. He also had a short spell with Arsenal de Sarandí before moving to Spain with Racing de Santander where he played three seasons with average impact, with a six-month loan stint with Segunda División side Córdoba CF in between.

After another loan in the Spanish second level, with CD Tenerife, Álvarez returned to Santander, appearing in 23 matches in 2006–07 as the Cantabria team finished tenth. In the following campaign he signed permanently with Córdoba for two years, with the Andalusians eventually barely maintaining their division two status.

In the 2009 off-season, after helping Córdoba finish mid-table, 31-year-old Álvarez returned to his country and a former club, signing with Arsenal Sarandí. Two years later, he joined San Martín de San Juan.

External links
 Argentine League statistics 
 
 El Mundo stats 
 

1978 births
Living people
Argentine sportspeople of Spanish descent
Footballers from Buenos Aires
Argentine footballers
Association football defenders
Association football midfielders
Association football utility players
Argentine Primera División players
Primera Nacional players
Club Atlético Lanús footballers
Arsenal de Sarandí footballers
San Martín de San Juan footballers
Argentinos Juniors footballers
La Liga players
Segunda División players
Racing de Santander players
Córdoba CF players
CD Tenerife players
Argentine expatriate footballers
Expatriate footballers in Spain
Argentine expatriate sportspeople in Spain